Monmouth is a city in and the county seat of Warren County, Illinois, United States. The population was 8,902 at the 2020 census, down from 9,444 in 2010. It is the home of Monmouth College and contains Monmouth Park, Harmon Park, North Park, Warfield Park, West Park, South Park, Garwood Park, Buster White Park and the Citizens Lake & Campground. It is the host of the Prime Beef festival, held annually the week after Labor Day. The festival is kicked off with one of the largest parades in Western Illinois. Monmouth is also known regionally as the "Maple City". It is part of the Galesburg Micropolitan Statistical Area.

History
The town established in 1831 was originally going to be called Kosciusko (the name was drawn out of a hat), but the founders of the town feared that it would be difficult to spell and pronounce. The name 'Monmouth' was put forward by a resident who had lived in Monmouth County, New Jersey.

In 1841, Latter Day Saint movement founder Joseph Smith appeared before Judge Stephen A. Douglas in an extradition hearing held at Monmouth's Warren County courthouse. The hearing, which was to determine whether Smith should be returned to Missouri to face murder charges, resulted in freedom for the defendant, as it was determined that his arrest had been invalid. Attorney Orville Browning, who would assume Douglas's Senate seat following his death, represented Smith.

Gunfighter Wyatt Earp was born in Monmouth.  For many years, the town watertower boasted that Monmouth was the "Home of Wyatt Earp." Controversial Civil War general Eleazer A. Paine practiced law there for many years. Abner C. Harding, Civil War General and Republican Congressman, lived in Monmouth and is buried in Monmouth Cemetery. Ronald Reagan lived in Monmouth for a while as a child when his father worked as a shoe salesman at the Colwell Department Store and mass murderer Richard Speck lived in Monmouth briefly as a child, and again in the spring of 1966.

Monmouth College, a private liberal arts college affiliated with the Presbyterian Church (U.S.A.), was founded in Monmouth in 1853 by Cedar Creek & South Henderson Presbyterian Churches. With James Cochran Porter & Robert Ross Founding in 1852 Monmouth Academy. The Rev. David Alexander Wallace serving as the first President 1856–1878. It is the second-largest employer in the city. Pi Beta Phi, the first national secret college society of women to be modeled after the Greek-letter fraternities of men, was founded on its campus in 1867. Just three years later in 1870, Kappa Kappa Gamma, international fraternity for women, was founded on its campus.

Monmouth was home to minor league baseball from 1890 to 1913. The Monmouth Browns and Monmouth Maple Cities (1890) played as members of the Central Association (1910–1913), Illinois-Missouri League (1908–1909), Central Interstate League (1889) and Illinois-Iowa League (1890). Monmouth teams played at 11th Street Park.

Monmouth was once home to one of the most unusually named high school sports organizations, the Zippers. Originally known as The Maroons, the Zipper nickname came about in the late 1930s when the school had a fast basketball team that would "Zip" up and down the court. Earl Bennett, a sportswriter nicknamed them "The Zippers" and the name stuck. The school went with the "Zipper" nickname until the 2004–05 school year when Monmouth consolidated with Roseville and the new Monmouth-Roseville High School adopted the nickname "The Titans". The class of 2005 was the last class named the Zippers. The Class of 2006 was the first class named the Titans.

Monmouth was the home for Western Stoneware, known for its "Maple Leaf" imprint and for producing "Sleepy Eye" collectible ceramics, which are recognizable by the blue-on-white bas-relief Indian profile. Western Stoneware closed in June 2006. Three former employees of Western Stoneware now operate the facility under the name "WS", Inc and have leased the building and logo from the city of Monmouth.

Geography
Monmouth is located at  (40.911531, -90.644579). Monmouth is located in Western Illinois where US Route 34, US Route 67, Illinois Route 164, and now the new Chicago to Kansas City Expressway (Illinois Route 110) intersect.

Climate

Demographics

As of the census of 2000, there were 9,841 people, 3,688 households, and 2,323 families residing in the city. The racial makeup of the city was 92.72% White, 2.80% African American, 0.23% Native American, 0.47% Asian, 0.19% Pacific Islander, 1.91% from other races, and 1.67% from two or more races. Hispanic or Latino of any race were 4.35% of the population.

There were 3,688 households, out of which 29.6% had children under the age of 18 living with them, 47.7% were married couples living together, 11.5% had a female householder with no husband present, and 37.0% were non-families. 32.1% of all households were made up of individuals, and 14.9% had someone living alone who was 65 years of age or older. The average household size was 2.37 and the average family size was 2.99.

In the city the population was spread out, with 23.0% under the age of 18, 17.1% from 18 to 24, 24.1% from 25 to 44, 20.3% from 45 to 64, and 15.5% who were 65 years of age or older. The median age was 34 years. For every 100 females, there were 88.5 males. For every 100 females age 18 and over, there were 85.3 males.

The median income for a household in the city was $33,641, and the median income for a family was $41,004. Males had a median income of $30,006 versus $20,144 for females. The per capita income for the city was $15,839. About 8.0% of families and 11.1% of the population were below the poverty line, including 14.5% of those under age 18 and 6.1% of those age 65 or over.

Media

Radio
WMOI-FM (97.7) (RDS)Format: Adult Contemporary
WRAM-AM(1330)/FM  (94.1) Format: News/Talk/Ag Classic Country Music
WPFS (105.9) "Proud Fighting Scots Radio" Format: Monmouth College Radio
WKAY-FM (105.3) "Today's Refreshing Light Rock"
WAAG-FM (94.9) "Thee Country Staton"
WLSR-FM (92.7) "Pure Rock The Laser"
WGIL-AM (1400/93.7 FM) "News, Talk, Sports"

Newspaper
Daily Review Atlas
Penny Saver

Culture

Museums and Galleries 

 The Warren County History Museum
 The Buchanan Center for the Arts
 Holt House (Pi Beta Phi founding house museum)
 Stewart House (Kappa Kappa Gamma founding house museum)

Notable people

John Clayton Allen – U.S. Congressman from Illinois from 1925-1933
Ken Blackman – Former NFL football player for the Cincinnati Bengals & Tampa Bay Buccaneers. Grew up in Monmouth.
 Clarence F. Buck – Illinois state senator, farmer, postmaster, and newspaper editor
Montgomery Case – bridge builder
 Charles Dryden – early 20th Century sportswriter
 Ellen Irene Diggs – American Anthropologist and author of African-American history. Born and raised in Monmouth.
Jug Earp – NFL football player from 1921 to 1932.
 Wyatt Earp – legendary lawman of the American West; born in Monmouth
 Loie Fuller – pioneer of modern dance
 Gladys Gale – singer and actress
 Ralph Greenleaf – Nineteen time world pocket billiards (Straight Pool) champion(1919-1938) in Hall of Fame
 Regis Groff, the second African-American elected to the Colorado Senate, lived in Monmouth as a child.
 J. P. Machado – Former NFL football player for the New York Jets.
Mike Miller (basketball, born 1964) – basketball coach
 Loren E. Murphy – Chief Justice of the Illinois Supreme Court and mayor of Monmouth
 Eleazer A. Paine – Civil War general, lived in Monmouth
 Ronald Reagan, 40th President of the United States, lived in Monmouth as a child
James Montgomery Rice, Illinois Congressman, helped establish United States National Guard
 James H. Rupp, Illinois state senator, Mayor of Monmouth, and businessman
 Richard Speck – mass murderer, lived in Monmouth
 Lawrence H. Stice, Illinois state representative and businessman, lived in Monmouth
 John Twomey – manualist
 J. Mayo Williams – pro football player, music producer in Blues Hall of Fame; grew up in Monmouth

See also
 List of photographs of Abraham Lincoln

References

External links
Homepage

 
Cities in Illinois
Cities in Warren County, Illinois
Populated places established in 1831
Ronald Reagan Trail
County seats in Illinois